The following radio stations broadcast on FM frequency 95.5 MHz:

Argentina
 Alfa y omega in Campana, Buenos Aires
 Amistad in Villa Huidobro, Córdoba
 Corazón in Rosario, Santa Fe
 Cyber in Villa Carlos Paz, Córdoba
 Concepto in Buenos Aires
 del molino in Trevelin, Chubut
 El Grito in Los Hornillos, Córdoba
 LRI803 Las Parejas in Las Parejas, Santa Fe
 la Zero in Rio Cuarto, Córdoba
 Libertad in Olavarria, Buenos Aires
 Live in Capilla del Monte, Córdoba
 LRI 736 Universal in Bahía Blanca, Buenos Aires
 LRP 782 Máxima in Ceres, Santa Fe
 Activa in Valle de Uco, Mendoza
 LRF321 Tiempo in Rio Turbio, Santa Cruz
 Más LRH 927 in Campo Grande, Misiones
 Metro Mendoza in Mendoza
 Mediterránea in Concepcion, Tucuman
 Popular in Chilecito, La Rioja
 Radio María in Adrogué, Buenos Aires
 Radio María in Maipú, Buenos Aires
 Radio Maria in Tres Isletas, Chaco
 Radio Maria in Camilo Aldao, Córdoba
 Radio Maria in Victoria, Entre Ríos
 Radio María in Abra Pampa, Jujuy
 Radio María in Eduardo Castex, La Pampa
 Uno in Dolores, Buenos Aires
 Vos in Brandsen, Buenos Aires

Australia
 2MRR in Port Macquarie, New South Wales
 2CP/T in Jindabyne, New South Wales
 ROK FM in Parkes, New South Wales
 Radio TAB in Bundaberg, Queensland
 Radio TAB in Emerald, Queensland
 Radio TAB in Roxby Downs, South Australia
 Radio TAB in Renmark, South Australia
 3CAT in Geelong, Victoria
 ABC Classic FM in Kalgoorlie, Western Australia
Merto FM, Love Relay 94

Canada (Channel 238)
 CBA-FM in Moncton, New Brunswick
 CBF-FM-14 in St-Jovite, Quebec
 CBKE-FM in La Loche, Saskatchewan
 CBKI-FM in Stanley Mission, Saskatchewan
 CBMU-FM in Harrington Harbour, Quebec
 CBN-FM-6 in Baie Verte, Newfoundland and Labrador
 CBNR-FM in Ramea, Newfoundland and Labrador
 CBOC-FM in Cornwall, Ontario
 CBUF-FM-4 in Prince George, British Columbia
 CBUH-FM in Chase, British Columbia
 CBUY-FM in Port Hardy, British Columbia
 CBWE-FM in Easterville, Manitoba
 CBWL-FM in Snow Lake, Manitoba
 CBWM-FM in Oxford House, Manitoba
 CBWQ-FM in South Indian Lake, Manitoba
 CFLX-FM in Sherbrooke, Quebec
 CFVD-FM in Degelis, Quebec
 CFXP-FM in Jasper, Alberta
 CHLB-FM in Lethbridge, Alberta
 CIAM-FM-2 in Buffalo Head, Alberta
 CIAM-FM-14 in Wabasca, Alberta
 CIAM-FM-15 in Fort Chipewyan, Alberta
 CIAM-FM-18 in Manning, Alberta
 CIYN-FM in Kincardine, Ontario
 CJLR-FM-6 in North Battleford, Saskatchewan
 CJLS-FM in Yarmouth, Nova Scotia
 CJOJ-FM in Belleville, Ontario
 CJTK-FM in Sudbury, Ontario
 CKGY-FM in Red Deer, Alberta
 VF2123 in Valemount, British Columbia
 VF2204 in Kemano, British Columbia
 VF2290 in Carol Lake Mining, Newfoundland and Labrador

China 
 CNR Business Radio in Huizhou
 CNR China Traffic Radio in Shanghai
 CNR Music Radio in Jinan and Xi'an
 CNR The Voice of China in Sanya

Colombia
 HJU54-FM in Bogotá, Bogotá D.C.

Ireland
 LMFM in Drogheda, County Louth

Malaysia
 Radio Klasik in Central Kelantan

Mexico
 XHCD-FM in Hermosillo, Sonora
 XHCMM-FM in Coalcomán, Michoacán
 XHELG-FM in León, Guanajuato
 XHGYC-FM in Guadalupe y Calvo, Chihuahua
 XHKIN-FM in Magdalena de Kino, Sonora
 XHKN-FM in Huetamo, Michoacán
 XHMP-FM in Torreón, Coahuila
 XHNAS-FM in Navajoa, Sonora
 XHOE-FM in Querétaro, Querétaro
 XHPCAR-FM in Ciudad del Carmen, Campeche
 XHPEDN-FM in Puerto Escondido, Oaxaca
 XHPTCS-FM in Tapachula, Chiapas
 XHSCEH-FM in Capulhuac, Estado de México
 XHRG-FM in Ciudad Acuña, Coahuila
 XHRO-FM in Zapopan, Jalisco
 XHTP-FM in Banderilla, Veracruz
 XHUAC-FM in Ensenada, Baja California
 XHZT-FM in Puebla, Puebla
 XHZTZ-FM in Zacatecas, Zacatecas

Philippines
DWDM-FM in Manila
DWEL-FM in Laoag City, Ilocos Norte
DWRC-FM in Legazpi City
DYMX in Cebu City
DXKR-FM in Davao City
DXEL in Zamboanga City

United States (Channel 238)
  in Bethany, Missouri
  in Diboll, Texas
  in Dodge City, Kansas
  in Honolulu, Hawaii
  in Wolfforth, Texas
  in Mora, Minnesota
 KBFF in Portland, Oregon
 KCBP in Westley, California
 KCHH in Worden, Montana
 KCHK-FM in New Prague, Minnesota
 KDHS-LP in Delta Junction, Alaska
 KFCE-LP in Wills Point, Texas
  in Sioux City, Iowa
  in Santa Fe, New Mexico
 KITX in Hugo, Oklahoma
  in Saint Ansgar, Iowa
  in Poplar Bluff, Missouri
 KKHK in Carmel, California
  in Austin, Texas
  in Bemidji, Minnesota
 KLAQ in El Paso, Texas
 KLBG in Lindsborg, Kansas
 KLDI-LP in Lodi, California
 KLOS in Los Angeles, California
 KMBR in Butte, Montana
 KMLS in Miles, Texas
  in Marysville, Kansas
  in Reno, Nevada
 KNLT in Palmer, Alaska
 KOME-FM in Tolar, Texas
 KOYH in Elaine, Arkansas
  in Rocky Ford, Colorado
 KQWJ-LP in Jonesboro, Louisiana
 KRQP-LP in Arlington, Texas
 KRRQ in Lafayette, Louisiana
  in Glenwood Springs, Colorado
  in Gordon, Nebraska
 KSGV-LP in Seagoville, Texas
 KSTO in Agana, Guam
  in Pleasant Hope, Missouri
 KTWF in Scotland, Texas
 KUJJ in McCall, Idaho
 KVAP-LP in Port Arthur, Texas
 KVWR-LP in Dallas, Texas
 KWAH-LP in Ennis, Texas
  in Tulsa, Oklahoma
 KWEY-FM in Clinton, Oklahoma
 KWNR in Henderson, Nevada
  in Midwest, Wyoming
  in Bethalto, Illinois
 KXEU in Ballard, Utah
  in Ogden, Utah
  in Jamestown, North Dakota
 KYOT in Phoenix, Arizona
 KYWY in Pine Bluffs, Wyoming
 KZAT-FM in Belle Plaine, Iowa
 KZFM in Corpus Christi, Texas
 KZLC-LP in Pineville, Louisiana
 WART-LP in Marshall, North Carolina
  in Buffalo Gap, Virginia
  in Salladasburg, Pennsylvania
 WCHI-FM in Chicago, Illinois
 WCPL-LP in Merritt Island, Florida
 WCXE-LP in Erlanger, Kentucky
  in Johnstown, Pennsylvania
  in Cleveland, Ohio
  in Odessa, New York
  in Hackleburg, Alabama
  in Indianapolis, Indiana
 WGFE in Glen Arbor, Michigan
  in Pekin, Illinois
  in Jackson, Mississippi
  in High Point, North Carolina
  in Wedgefield, South Carolina
  in Wausau, Wisconsin
 WIXV in Savannah, Georgia
  in Thomasville, Alabama
 WJOR-LP in Whitesville, Kentucky
 WKQI in Detroit, Michigan
 WLDI in Juno Beach, Florida
  in Providence, Rhode Island
 WMFH-LP in Columbus, Mississippi
 WMXP-LP in Greenville, South Carolina
 WNGR-LP in Tigerville, South Carolina
 WNIR-LP in Newberry, South Carolina
 WOOO-LP in Defiance, Ohio
  in Oxford, Mississippi
  in Morningside, Maryland
 WPLJ in New York, New York
 WPPI in Topsham, Maine
  in Pinetops, North Carolina
  in Prestonsburg, Kentucky
 WRJM-LP in Cullman, Alabama
 WSBB-FM in Doraville, Georgia
 WSKR-LP in Jacksonville, Florida
  in Nashville, Tennessee
  in Dothan, Alabama
 WUTT-LP in Erie, Pennsylvania
 WVXE-LP in Orange Park, Florida
 WWMV-LP in Madison, Wisconsin
 WXMG in Lancaster, Ohio
 WXXX in South Burlington, Vermont
 WYJB in Albany, New York
 WYJR-LP in Middlesboro, Kentucky
 WYND-FM in Silver Springs, Florida

References

Lists of radio stations by frequency